Black October is the third solo studio album by American rapper Sadat X. It was released on Female Fun Music in 2006.

Track listing

References

External links

2006 albums
Sadat X albums
Albums produced by Ayatollah
Albums produced by Da Beatminerz
Albums produced by Diamond D
Albums produced by Marco Polo
Albums produced by DJ Spinna
Albums produced by J-Zone